The Spain women's national under-19 volleyball team represents Spain in under-19 international women's volleyball competitions and friendly matches, It is ruled and managed by Spanish Royal Volleyball Federation That is an affiliate of Federation of International Volleyball FIVB and also a part of European Volleyball Confederation CEV.

History

Results

FIVB U19 World Championship
 Champions   Runners up   Third place   Fourth place

Europe U18 / U17 Championship
 Champions   Runners up   Third place   Fourth place

Team

Past squad
The following is the Spanish roster in the 2017 European U18 Championship.

Head coach:  Pascual Saurib

References

External links
Official website

Volleyball
National women's under-18 volleyball teams
Volleyball in Spain